The women's freestyle 72 kilograms wrestling competition at the 2002 Asian Games in Busan was held on 7 October and 8 October at the Yangsan Gymnasium.

Schedule
All times are Korea Standard Time (UTC+09:00)

Results

Final standing

References
2002 Asian Games Report, Page 783
FILA Database

Wrestling at the 2002 Asian Games